Fir Island is bounded by North and South Forks of the Skagit River and Skagit Bay of Puget Sound in the southwestern corner of Skagit County, Washington. The island is connected by bridge to the village of Conway, located on the east shore of the South Fork of the Skagit River. Near the northeast tip of Fir Island is the site of the 19th-century town of Skagit City which declined after upstream log jams were removed in 1877.

Natural history
A major component of the Skagit River Delta, the island is an important habitat for wildlife. Migrating from the northern portion of Wrangel Island in Russia, 30,000 to 70,000 snow geese spend the winter on the Skagit River Delta and the Fraser River Delta of British Columbia.  Important internationally, this population and one that winters in California, are the only snow geese that migrate between Eurasia and North America and the only remnant still extant in Eurasia.

Other migratory waterfowl include tundra swans, trumpeter swans and the bald eagle. Over the course of a year, 180 species of birds have been recorded at Skagit Wildlife Area,  of mostly tidelands and intertidal marsh, the largest section of which is located on the southern margin of the island.

Near the south end of Fir Island, the Wiley Slough Restoration Project is intended to restore natural processes to a  portion of Skagit Wildlife Area. The main goal of the project is to increase the diversity of species that depend on estuaries, especially Puget Sound Chinook Salmon that are listed as threatened under the provisions of the Endangered Species Act. Despite opposition by hunters, the project is supported by many in the community and Governor Christine Gregoire.

Skagit River floods

Fir Island is periodically flooded by the Skagit River.

On February 27, 1932 Fir Island flooded after a dike broke between Fir and Skagit City. A number of buildings were carried away by the river, and area farmers lost between 150 and 200 chickens, 4 head of cattle, and 8 or 10 sheep.

No human fatalities occurred but livestock deaths were reported. Dike repairs the following summer cost $7 million.

A total of 3,400 people were evacuated from flood prone areas along the river. Such floods deposit great quantities of driftwood along river channels and on tidelands.

References

Islands of Skagit County, Washington
Islands of Puget Sound
River islands of Washington (state)